Columbus Crew SC is a professional soccer team in the United States. The team is a member of the Eastern Conference of Major League Soccer, the top professional soccer league of the United States and Canada. Crew SC has had eight different head coaches since joining the league in 1996.  Timo Liekoski, the only Finnish head coach in MLS history, was the first head coach in 1996, but started 6-16 and was fired midseason to be replaced by Tom Fitzgerald. Fitzgerald is the club's leader in career wins (86) and playoff wins (nine), and is tied with Gregg Berhalter for first in playoff appearances (four).

Greg Andrulis, Fitzgerald's replacement, was the first head coach to lead Columbus to a major tournament victory in 2002 by winning the Lamar Hunt U.S. Open Cup.  In 2004, Columbus won the Supporters' Shield for having the best record during the regular season, but Andrulis, who had been with the team since 1997 as an assistant, was fired during the 2005 season. When Sigi Schmid began the 2006 season, it was the first time since the team's founding that a new coach took over in the off-season. He coached the team from 2006 through 2008 and led Crew SC to its first MLS Cup Championship in 2008, a season in which he also won MLS Coach of the Year.  After that season, Schmid left to coach the newly formed Seattle Sounders FC, and former player and assistant coach Robert Warzycha replaced him.  This would be Warzycha's second tenure as head coach after coaching 16 games as interim head coach in 2005.  Warzycha was the Crew's head coach from 2008 to 2013, and his overall record of 70-59-41 leaves him tied with Tom Fitzgerald (1996–2001) for the most regular-season wins (70) as head coach of Columbus.

On November 6, 2013, Gregg Berhalter was named as head coach.

Coaches

References

Columbus Crew coaches
Columbus Crew SC
Columbus Crew SC head coaches
Columbus, Ohio-related lists